Prank Patrol (known as Prank Patrol: Road Trip for its third season, also known as Prank Patrol Down Under in the UK) is the Australian version of the original Canadian series Prank Patrol. The show was made for the then new ABC3 channel (now ABC ME) which specialised in children's programming. It is hosted by Scott “Scotty” Tweedie and produced by the ABC.

Premise

The show follows Scotty and his ninjas helping children to pull off a prank against someone they know, such as a parent or friend. Scotty then takes the new recruit to their "HQ", where they establish a plan to prank their target. Scotty meets with real prank experts, such as special effects experts and makeup or costume artists. The new recruit calls their target to lure them into the prank. The prank builds to a climax, where the famous catchphrase "you've been pranked by the prank patrol!" is shouted by everyone in on the prank.

Fillers

Recipe for a Prank
Similar to the original Canadian format this filler is an animated short of which explains how to set up one's own prank.

Ninjas on the Loose
The Ninjas usually go to a public place and commit a prank, whether it be hiding behind a park bench and making fart sounds or scaring strangers.

Episodes

Production
The show is produced by the ABC and based on the original Canadian series. The first series consisted of 25 episodes of 25-minute lengths. Series 2 was announced on 15 April 2010 with another 39 episodes being produced. It was announced filming for series two would start on 2 August 2010 and film twenty-six episodes in Melbourne and thirteen in Brisbane.

References

External links
 

Hidden camera television series
Australian Broadcasting Corporation original programming
2009 Australian television series debuts
2013 Australian television series endings
Australian children's television series